Thomas or Tom Williamson may refer to:
 Tom Williamson, Baron Williamson (1897–1983), British trade union leader and Member of Parliament
 Tom Williamson (English footballer) (born 1984), English footballer
 Tom Williamson (Australian footballer) (born 1998), Australian footballer
 Thomas Williamson (soccer) (born 1999), American soccer player
 Tom Williamson (Scottish footballer) (1901–1988), Scottish footballer
 Thomas Williamson (Australian politician) (1853–1921), New South Wales politician
 Tom Williamson (golfer) (1880–1950), English professional golfer
 Thomas Smith Williamson (1800–1879), American physician and missionary
 Tom Williamson (actor) (born 1990), American actor
 Thomas Wilson Williamson (1887–1974), American architect
 Thomas Williamson (surgeon) (1815–1885), Scottish surgeon and medical officer of health
 Thomas Andrew Williamson, American serial killer

See also 
Nicol Williamson (Thomas Nicol Williamson, 1936–2011), Scottish actor